Bitz is a municipality in the Zollernalbkreis district of Baden-Württemberg, Germany.

History
Bitz was a possession of the  until 1386. Bitz became an independent municipality within the Kingdom of Württemberg in 1832. Bitz enjoyed large-scale industrial growth in the 1960s in every direction but south. In 1973, following , Bitz was reassigned to the newly created Zollernalb district. Another period of expansion, this time residential, elapsed in the 1980s.

Geography
The municipality (Gemeinde) of Bitz is politically located in the Zollernalb district of Baden-Württemberg, a state of the Federal Republic of Germany. Elevation above sea level in the municipal area ranges from a low of  Normalnull (NN) to a high of  NN.

Coat of arms
Bitz's municipal coat of arms displays a white eagle's wing on a field of blue below a chief of yellow containing a black stag's antler. This pattern was awarded to the municipality of by the Federal Ministry of the Interior on 17 April 1958. A flag was issued by the government of the provisional Württemberg-Hohenzollern on 8 May 1951. The first pattern was a seal from 1930 with two bobbins and two sewing needles. This was replaced on 14 March 1938 with a coat of arms displaying a silver loom with blue thread, which was approved by the local Reichsstatthalter, Wilhelm Murr. Both these patterns recalled Bitz's industrial history, but in 1958 the loom was replaced with the eagle wing to represent the House of Lichtenstein; the stag horn, references Württemberg.

Transportation
Bitz is connected to the network of German roadways by the L448.

References

External links
  (in German)

Württemberg